William Wildman Campbell (April 2, 1853 – August 13, 1927) was a U.S. Representative from Ohio.

Born in Rochester, Vermont, Campbell attended the public schools, Goddard Seminary, Barre, Vermont, and Tufts College, Medford, Massachusetts.
He studied law.
He was admitted to the bar in 1878 and commenced practice at Napoleon, Ohio.
He served as prosecuting attorney for Henry County from 1893 to 1896.

Campbell was elected as a Republican to the Fifty-ninth Congress (March 4, 1905 – March 3, 1907).
He was an unsuccessful candidate for reelection in 1906 to the Sixtieth Congress and for election in 1908 to the Sixty-first Congress.
He resumed the practice of law in Napoleon, Ohio.
He served as member of the State constitutional convention of 1911 and 1912.
He died in Napoleon, Ohio, August 13, 1927.
He was interred in Forest Hill Cemetery.

Sources

1853 births
1927 deaths
Republican Party members of the United States House of Representatives from Ohio
People from Napoleon, Ohio
Ohio Constitutional Convention (1912)
Tufts University alumni
Ohio lawyers
County district attorneys in Ohio
People from Rochester, Vermont
19th-century American lawyers